Inverness Museum and Art Gallery is a museum and gallery on Castle Wynd in Inverness in the Highlands of Scotland.  Admission is free. The collection and facilities are managed by High Life Highland on behalf of Highland Council.

The original Inverness Museum opened in 1881 and began to develop as a Highland and Jacobite collection. One of the important early additions was a group of historic Stuart portraits donated by the family of Prince Frederick Duleep Singh, including a portrait of Prince Charles Edward Stuart attributed to Pompeo Batoni and a Cromwell that Prince Freddy hung upside down. Subsequent additions to the collection include examples of Highland landscapes by Scottish artists including Alexander Nasmyth, John Quinton Pringle and  Tom Scott.

The Castle Wynd/Bridge Street area of Inverness was cleared for re-development in 1963 and the current complex was built. Since 1963 there have been a two major redevelopments to improve the museum: the first in 1982 to incorporate a café, new permanent galleries and temporary exhibition/art galleries, and again in 2006 it was closed for six months to allow a £1.3m makeover, with the re-design completed in time for Highland 2007.

The Museum presents history and heritage in the Capital of the Highlands. On the ground floor you will find Scottish geology and natural history as well as the archaeology of the Highlands including Pictish stones. The displays continue on the first floor with the more recent history of the Highlands – Jacobite memorabilia, Inverness silver, Highland weapons and bagpipes. The first floor features a programme of temporary exhibitions. 

In 1980 a puma was captured in Inverness-shire; it is believed that it was an abandoned pet. The puma was subsequently put into a wildlife park. When it died it was stuffed and placed in the Museum.

References

External links
Museum website

Culture in Inverness
Museums in Highland (council area)
Local museums in Scotland
History of the Scottish Highlands
Jacobitism
Art museums and galleries in Scotland